The 2017–18 Gardner–Webb Runnin' Bulldogs men's basketball team represented Gardner–Webb University during the 2017–18 NCAA Division I men's basketball season. The Runnin' Bulldogs, led by fifth-year head coach Tim Craft, played their home games at the Paul Porter Arena in Boiling Springs, North Carolina as members of the Big South Conference. They finished the season 14–18, 9–9 in Big South play to finish in a four-way tie for fifth place. As the No. 6 seed in the Big South tournament, they lost to Winthrop in the quarterfinals.

Previous season
The Runnin' Bulldogs  finished the 2016–17 season 18–13, 11–7 in Big South play to finish in fourth place. In the Big South tournament, they defeated High Point in the quarterfinals before losing in the semifinals to Winthrop.

Roster

Schedule and results

|-
!colspan=9 style=| Non-conference regular season

|-
!colspan=9 style=| Big South regular season

|-
!colspan=9 style=| Big South tournament

References

Gardner–Webb Runnin' Bulldogs men's basketball seasons
Gardner-Webb
Gardner-Webb Runnin' Bulldogs men's basketball
Gardner-Webb Runnin' Bulldogs men's basketball